Philip Hearle (born 31 May 1978) is a South African cricketer. He played in six first-class and ten List A matches from 1996/97 to 1999/00.

See also
 List of Boland representative cricketers

References

External links
 

1978 births
Living people
South African cricketers
Boland cricketers
Easterns cricketers
Gauteng cricketers
Cricketers from Johannesburg